Darque is a civil parish in the municipality of Viana do Castelo, Portugal. The population in 2011 was 7,817, in an area of 9.01 km2.

References

Freguesias of Viana do Castelo